Morgan Mwenya (born 21 June 1953) is a Zambian boxer. He competed in the men's featherweight event at the 1972 Summer Olympics. In his first fight at the 1972 Summer Olympics, he lost to Pasqualino Morbidelli of Italy.

References

1953 births
Living people
Zambian male boxers
Olympic boxers of Zambia
Boxers at the 1972 Summer Olympics
Place of birth missing (living people)
Featherweight boxers